Prancer may refer to:

 Prancer (film), the 1989 motion picture
 One of Santa Claus's reindeer, as named in "The Night Before Christmas"
 Tartan Prancer, fictional vehicle featured in 2015 film Vacation